Ned Crotty (born September 26, 1986) is an American former professional lacrosse player. Hey played for the Dallas Rattlers of Major League Lacrosse, and played for the NCAA Division I college lacrosse team at Duke University. He also played indoor lacrosse for the Philadelphia Wings of the National Lacrosse League, and with the Chrome Lacrosse Club of the Premier Lacrosse League

He currently works for LeagueApps as Director of Enterprise Sales - Lacrosse.

Early years
Crotty attended and played lacrosse at the Delbarton School in New Jersey, graduating in 2005 and winning the state's lacrosse Tournament of Champions in each of his four years on the team. He also played varsity hockey, as well as lacrosse, earning NJ Player of the Year by The Star-Ledger, making him the only student-athlete to earn recognition in two different sports in a single year.

College career
Crotty entered the 2010 season ranked seventh in career assists (84) and 17th in career points (153) at Duke. Crotty was an All American and won the Tewaaraton Trophy for most outstanding college lacrosse player in 2010. On May 31, 2010, Ned and the Duke Lacrosse team won their first ever Division I NCAA Men's Lacrosse Championship. He and teammate Max Quinzani were a scoring duo at Duke for two years following the departure of Matt Danowski and Zack Greer. Crotty is considered to be the best passer in Duke lacrosse history, posting 63 assists in a single season, a Duke University record.

Professional career
He was the 1st overall pick in 2010 MLL Draft by the New York Lizards. He most recently played with the Dallas Rattlers.

He previously played for the Philadelphia Wings and the Colorado Mammoth of the NLL.

He joined Paul Rabil’s PLL for its inaugural season in 2019 as a member of the Chrome Lacrosse Club.

Crotty announced his retirement on April 12, 2022.

Statistics

NLL

Duke University

MLL

PLL

References

External links 
 Duke University bio
 NLL career statistics via pointstreak.com

 
family:
declan crotty

1986 births
Living people
American lacrosse players
Colorado Mammoth players
Delbarton School alumni
Duke Blue Devils men's lacrosse players
Lacrosse players from New Jersey
Major League Lacrosse players
People from Harding Township, New Jersey
Philadelphia Wings players
Sportspeople from Morris County, New Jersey
Dallas Rattlers players
Premier Lacrosse League players